Suvir Saran, (Born 29 November 1972 in New Delhi, India) is a chef, cookbook author, educator as well as a farmer who specializes in bringing Indian cooking to the American kitchen. Currently lives on American Masala Farm with his partner Charlie, in Hebron, New York.

He studied visual arts at Sir J. J. School of Art in Bombay before leaving India in 1993 to study in New York City at the School of Visual Arts. During this time he enjoyed cooking and entertaining friends when he was not working or going to school. He quickly took what was a hobby and turned it into a catering business Rasoi, The Indian Kitchen. In 1997 joined the staff at Department of Food and Nutrition at New York University's Professional Development and Continuing Education Program. Later becoming an executive chef at Dévi on East 18th Street in New York City, appearing on Bravo's Top Chef: Masters (season 3) and writing several best selling cookbooks. On 10 November 2015, Suvir Saran hosted an evening of bold Indian cuisine as part of the University of Notre Dame's prestigious celebrity chef series.

Top Chef Masters
Suvir appeared as a contestant on the third season of Bravo's Top Chef Masters making it to the fourth round. Eliminated during "The Biggest Loser" episode, he chose to create a vegetarian burger rather than the requested bacon cheese burger and did a monologue about the health impacts of red meat. During the exit interview on the show he stated he had no regrets about his choices and what he had said.

Cookbooks
Masala Farm (Chronicle Books, 2011)

American Masala (Clarkson Potter, 2007)

Indian Home Cooking (Clarkson Potter, 2004)

Dévi
Dévi, located in New York City, specialized in the flavors of Indian home cooking. The 75-seat restaurant got its name from the mother goddess. Recipient of a two star rating from New York Times, a three star rating from New York Magazine and the first Indian restaurant in the US to have earned a Michelin Star.  Suvir left Devi in March 2012, and it closed 1 April 2012.

American Masala Farm
American Masala Farm  is a nineteenth-century farm of nearly seventy acres with a farmhouse and eight out-buildings. Found in the Upstate New York town of Hebron, the farm is where you can find Suvir and Charlie tending to their variety of heritage breeds of poultry, goats, cattle and other livestock. They follow the recommendations of the American Livestock Breeds Conservancy (ALBC) to find the breeds which need preservation. The name of the farm comes from Suvir's 2007 cookbook, American Masala and they felt it did well to bring together both their native lands. When they aren't busy with the animals they are busy in the kitchen and entertaining the number of guests that visit, from friends to family.

"Masala Farm" (Chronicle Books, 2011)

• Finalist - James Beard Award, American Category

American Masala (Clarkson Potter, 2007)

• Martha Stewart Living - Top 10 List

• NY Times - Top 20 Cookbooks of Year

• Newsweek and Newsweek International - Top 10 Cookbooks of Year

• Bon Apetite Magazine Top 4 Cookbook picks

• Epicurious.com - Top 10 Cookbooks of Year

•Indian Home Cooking (Clarkson Potter, 2004)

• USA Today - Top 5 Cookbooks of Year

• Newsweek and Newsweek International - Top 10 Cookbooks of Year

Resources
Suvir Saran - Official Site
Suvir Saran - Official Blog

References

1972 births
Living people
Indian chefs
People from New Delhi
People from Hebron, New York